Kyle Neville Porter (born January 19, 1990) is a Canadian professional soccer player for Blue Devils FC in League1 Ontario.

Club career

Vancouver Whitecaps
Porter grew up in nearby Mississauga, Ontario and attended John Fraser Secondary School, St. Joan of Arc Catholic Secondary School and Burnaby Central Secondary School, and played club soccer for the Erin Mills Soccer Club and the Mississauga Falcons before joining the Vancouver Whitecaps FC Academy program in 2007.

He appeared in friendly games with the Residency team during tours of Germany and played in the prestigious Dallas Cup in 2007. Porter also played with the Vancouver Whitecaps Residency team in its inaugural season in the USL Premier Development League in 2008.

Loan to Energie Cottbus
Porter was loaned to Energie Cottbus after impressing the German club during a one-month trial in the summer of 2008, and subsequently played for Cottbus' U-19 Junior Bundesliga side. He was promoted to the Cottbus U-23 reserve squad that played in Germany's fourth-tier Regionalliga Nord during the second half of the 2008–2009 season, making five appearances and scoring one goal. He continued with Cottbus II in the 2009–2010 season, making 11 appearances and scoring one goal.

Return from loan
Porter returned to the Vancouver Whitecaps in mid-2010, and made his debut as a substitute on October 2, 2010, in Vancouver's last game of the 2010 USSFD2 regular season, a 2–2 tie with the Portland Timbers. Porter delivered the cross for the equalizing goal in the match.

Porter played with the MLS Whitecaps during the 2011 pre-season, he was offered a contract by the club but both parties could not agree to terms.

FC Edmonton
He then signed with FC Edmonton of the North American Soccer League in April 2011. He made his debut for Edmonton on April 27, 2011, in the team's 2011 Canadian Championship match with Toronto FC. Porter was under contract with FC Edmonton for the 2012 season.

D.C. United
After an extended trial period, Porter signed with Major League Soccer's D.C. United on February 23, 2013. Since joining United, he has become a regular starter. On May 19, 2013, Porter scored his first goal for United, off a cross from Chris Pontius against Sporting Kansas City. The match ended in a 1–1 draw. Porter's option was declined by DC United at the close of the 2014 season. In total, he played 32 games, scored 3 goals, and made one assist for DC in MLS.

Atlanta Silverbacks
Porter signed with the Atlanta Silverbacks of the NASL on March 3, 2015. He made his debut against Indy Eleven in Atlanta's season opener on April 4.

Ottawa Fury
In January 2016 Porter made his return to Canada, signing with Ottawa Fury FC. In December 2016, the Fury announced that Porter would not return to the team as the club moved to USL in 2017.

Tampa Bay Rowdies
In March 2017, Porter signed with the Tampa Bay Rowdies in the USL.

Return to Ottawa
After a two-week trial, Porter signed for a second spell with the Ottawa Fury on 8 February 2018. He was released by the club in July 2018 after making three appearances.

Return to Tampa Bay
On July 13, 2018, Porter signed for a second spell with the Tampa Bay Rowdies. He made five appearances for Tampa that year.

York9
On November 29, 2018, Porter signed with York9 FC of the Canadian Premier League. He made his debut for York9 in their inaugural match against Forge FC on April 27, 2019. That year, he made 25 league appearances, scoring two goals, and made six appearances in the Canadian Championship. On December 9, 2019, Porter re-signed with York for 2020. During the shortened 2020 season, he made six appearances, scoring one goal.

Return to FC Edmonton
On December 23, 2020, Porter returned to FC Edmonton for the 2021 season. In January 2022, Porter departed the club.

Blue Devils FC
In 2022, he played for Blue Devils FC in League1 Ontario. On August 14, he scored a hat trick against Unionville Milliken SC. In December 2022, he retired from professional soccer.

International career
Porter has represented Canada at U-17, and U-20 levels. He appeared in all four Group B matches of CONCACAF final round qualifying for the 2007 FIFA U-17 World Cup, and played two games for the Canada U-20's at the 2009 CONCACAF U-20 Championship.

Porter made his senior team debut on January 26, 2013, in a friendly against Denmark as a second half sub for Russell Teibert, the game ended as a 4–0 defeat. On July 6, Porter was named to the 2013 CONCACAF Gold Cup roster as a replacement for Nana Attakora who sustained an injury. Porter was not initially supposed to be an active member of the roster, but three days later Randy Edwini-Bonsu was forced to leave the Gold Cup due to injury and Simeon Jackson due to a club commitment which forced him to join the team before its second match against Mexico.

Personal life
Porter's father was born in Jamaica and his mother was born in Canada. He speaks English and picked up some German while playing in Germany.
His wife's name is Rachel Michelle Rosart. His son's name is Kyden Anthony Neville Porter.

Career statistics

Honours
D.C. United
 U.S. Open Cup: 2013

References

External links
 
 
 
 

1990 births
Living people
Association football utility players
Canadian soccer players
Soccer players from Toronto
Soccer players from Mississauga
Canadian people of Jamaican descent
Black Canadian soccer players
Canadian expatriate soccer players
Expatriate footballers in Germany
Canadian expatriate sportspeople in Germany
Expatriate soccer players in the United States
Canadian expatriate sportspeople in the United States
Vancouver Whitecaps Residency players
FC Energie Cottbus II players
Vancouver Whitecaps (1986–2010) players
FC Edmonton players
D.C. United players
Richmond Kickers players
Atlanta Silverbacks players
Ottawa Fury FC players
Tampa Bay Rowdies players
York United FC players
USL League Two players
Regionalliga players
Oberliga (football) players
USSF Division 2 Professional League players
North American Soccer League players
Major League Soccer players
USL Championship players
Canadian Premier League players
Canada men's youth international soccer players
Canada men's international soccer players
2009 CONCACAF U-20 Championship players
2013 CONCACAF Gold Cup players
Première ligue de soccer du Québec players
Blue Devils FC players